Cian Dillon (born 30 October 1988) is an Irish hurler who plays for club side Crusheen. He usually plays as a left corner-back, but can also be deployed as a full-back. Dillon was a member of the Clare senior hurling team that won the 2013 All-Ireland Championship.

Career
Dillon first came to prominence as a hurler at juvenile and underage levels with the Crusheen club, however, it was as a member of the club's senior hurling team that he has enjoyed his greatest successes. He won back-to-back Clare Championship titles in 2010 and 2011.

Dillon first played for Clare as a member of the minor team in 2006, before later playing at full-back on Clare's All-Ireland Under-21 Championship-winning team in 2009. He made his first appearance with the Clare senior team in 2010. Dillon won an All-Ireland Championship medal in 2013, when Clare claimed the title for the first time in 16 years. He later won a National Hurling League medal as joint captain of the team in 2016. Dillon announced his retirement from inter-county hurling on 9 January 2019.

Career statistics

Honours

Crusheen
Clare Senior Hurling Championship (2): 2010, 2011

Clare
All-Ireland Senior Hurling Championship (1): 2013
National League Division 1 (1): 2016
National League Division 1B (1): 2012
All-Ireland Under-21 Hurling Championship (1): 2009
Munster Under-21 Hurling Championship (1): 2009

References

1988 births
Living people
Crusheen hurlers
Clare inter-county hurlers
University of Galway hurlers
Alumni of the University of Galway